Real Republicans FC, is a Sierra Leonean football club from the capital Freetown, Sierra Leone. Currently playing in the Nationwide First Division, the second highest football league in Sierra Leone. Real Republicans were historically one of the most successful clubs in Sierra Leonean football; having won the Premier League in 1981, 1983, and 1984; and also won the Sierra Leone FA Cup in 1986.

Achievements
Sierra Leone League: 3
 1981, 1983, 1984
Sierra Leonean FA Cup: 1
 1986

Performance in CAF competitions
 African Cup of Champions Clubs: 3 appearances
1982: First Round
1984: First Round
1985: First Round

CAF Cup Winners' Cup: 3 appearances
1981 – Second Round
1987 – withdrew in Preliminary Round
1988 – Second Round

References 

Football clubs in Sierra Leone